Synaphea petiolaris is a shrub endemic to Western Australia.

It blooms between June and January producing yellow flowers.

It is found around swamps and on sand plains, slopes and low-lying areas in the Peel, South West, Great Southern and Goldfields-Esperance regions of Western Australia where it grows in sandy soils over laterite or granite.

References

Eudicots of Western Australia
petiolaris
Endemic flora of Western Australia
Plants described in 1810